Hoseyn Ali Kandi-ye Ajam (also Romanized as Ḩoseyn ‘Alī Kandī-ye ‘Ajam and Ḩoseyn‘alī-ye Kandī ‘Ajam; also known as Ḩoseyn‘alī Kandī) is a village in Yowla Galdi Rural District, in the Central District of Showt County, West Azerbaijan Province, Iran. At the 2006 census, its population was 153, in 37 families.

References 

Populated places in Showt County